The Arequipa Metropolitan Area is the name used to refer to the metropolitan area whose principal city is Arequipa, according to Metropolitan Development Plan of Arequipa According to population statistics of INEI It is the second most populous metropolitan area of Peru in year 2017.

Population

According to INEI the population of Arequipa metropolitan in the year 2007 was of 899.291 people and according to  Metropolitan Development Plan of Arequipa for year 2007 this had 822,479 people distributed in its metropolitan districts. According to the census 2007 and estimated population of INEI In the table is shown the population of Arequipa Metropolitan by districts:

2017 Census

Graphics of evolution of the population 
In the following Graphics the evolution of the population of Arequipa metropolitan area.

See also 
 Arequipa province
 List of metropolitan areas of Peru
 Peru

References

Metropolitan areas of Peru